Hmayak Siras (born Hmayak Sahaki Voskanian; 15 February 1902 – 16 August 1983) was an Armenian writer, editor, and translator. He is regarded as a significant figure in the development of twentieth-century Armenian literature. He was a member of the USSR Writers' Union and served twice as the executive secretary of the Writers Union of Armenia.

Early life and career
Hmayak Siras was born Hmayak Sahaki Voskanian on 15 February 1902 in Karakilisa, a small town in Alashkert municipality in the historical region of Western Armenia (now part of Turkey). His parents were Sahak and Mariza Voskanian. He was the first of five children. His parents encouraged his love of literature, art, and music. He studied at a local school until the age of fourteen, when the Armenian genocide forced his family to flee to Tbilisi, the capital of Georgia.

In 1921, Siras returned to Armenia with his family. He enrolled at Yerevan State University, where he graduated from the History and Literature Department in 1925. He graduated from the MSU Faculty of Journalism at Moscow State University in 1932.

In 1922, Siras published his first story, "In a Boiling Cauldron," in Yerevan magazine Murch. Between 1922 and 1940, Siras continued to publish novels and short stories, ranging from strictly realistic to those incorporating legendary elements. By this time, he had adopted the pen name Hmayak Siras, which he took from the Henryk Sienkiewicz novel Kamo Ridge.

During this period, Siras worked as a journalist and editor at various newspapers and magazines in Armenia. From 1939 to 1941, Voskanian served as the Executive Secretary of the Writers' Union of Armenia.

Service in the Red Army

In 1941, Siras enlisted with the Soviet Red Army. After the completion of academic military courses, he was appointed to the rank of major and was made editor-translator of Armenian publications in the Main Political Department of the Ministry of Defence. He served until the end of World War II.

Later career

After the war, Siras left the military. He was again elected as the Executive Secretary of the Writers' Union of Armenia, serving from 1946 to 1948. In 1946, Siras published his first war novel, Father and Son, followed by Singer in 1952 and Ararat in 1956. In 1968, he was given the honorary title Honorary Worker of Culture of Armenia.

Siras was well-known for translations of texts from Russian to Armenian. In 1972, he was made an honorary member of the Kalevala Society of Helsinki for his translation of the Finnish epic Kalevala. His most notable novel, a historical epic titled The Native Land, was published in Armenian in 1974 and in Russian in 1979. The Native Land is a lengthy historical portrait of the Armenian people. His last works are the novels In the Bindings of Time and his memoir, 21 Years with Avetik Isahakyan.

Personal life
Hmayak Siras married Tamara Askanazovna Voskanian (née Zakharyan) in 1925. They had three daughters: Lusia, Mary, and Anahit.

Death and legacy
Hmayak Siras died on 14 August 1983 in Yerevan. He is buried at the cemetery in Nubarashen District. Commemorative stamps bearing his portrait were released for his 100th and 110th birthdays. The Armenian government installed a memorial plaque on the building of the house in which he lived his final years.

Gallery

References 

1902 births
1983 deaths
20th-century Armenian writers
20th-century Armenian novelists
Armenian male novelists
Armenian translators
Armenian male short story writers
Writers from Yerevan
Yerevan State University alumni
Moscow State University alumni
People from Ağrı
Armenians from the Ottoman Empire
Soviet Armenians
20th-century translators